The National Maritime Museum is a maritime museum in Amsterdam in the Netherlands. 

The museum had 419,060 visitors in 2012. It ranked as 11th most visited museum in the Netherlands in 2013. The museum had 300,000 visitors in 2015. In 2017 the museum received 350,000 visitors.

Collection 
The museum is dedicated to maritime history and contains many artefacts associated with shipping and sailing. The collection contains, among other things, paintings, scale models, weapons and world maps. The paintings depict Dutch naval officers such as Michiel de Ruyter and historical sea battles.

The map collection includes works by 17th-century cartographers Willem Blaeu and his son Joan Blaeu. The museum also has a surviving copy of the first edition of Maximilianus Transylvanus' work, De Moluccis Insulis, the first to describe Ferdinand Magellan's voyage around the world.

Amsterdam replica 
Moored outside the museum is a replica of the Amsterdam, an 18th-century ship which sailed between the Netherlands and the East Indies. The replica was built in 1985–1990.

Replica in China 

History 
The museum is housed in a former naval storehouse, 's Lands Zeemagazijn or Admiraliteits Magazijn, designed by the Dutch architect Daniël Stalpaert and constructed in 1656. The museum moved to this building in 1973.

After an extensive renovation in 2007–2011, Het Scheepvaartmuseum reopened on 2 October 2011.

Controversies 
In 2013, there was a deadly shooting incident during the "Waterfront" festivity at the museum. For the next three months, the museum was not allowed to rent out its space. 

After 2013, the number of visitors started to decline and director Willem Bijleveld, who had supervised the renovation of 2011, departed after a tenure of 18 years. The museum was criticised for having become too commercial for a cultural institution and having been turned into an amusement park. The "Raad van Cultuur" — a government board that monitors cultural activity in the Netherlands and advises the government on subsidies for museums — judged that the Scheepvaartmuseum had focused too much on entertainment and not enough on its task as a museum. 

The next director was Pauline Krikke, the former mayor of Arnhem and a prominent member of the VVD, a centre-right political party that was senior partner in the second Rutte cabinet. Krikke came into conflict with the management team of the museum and the "Raad van Toezicht"
(Board of Supervision) concerning a perceived lack of communication. During a confrontation on 15 November 2015, the management team expressed its lack of confidence in Krikke, who resigned. The former director of the Rembrandt House Museum, Michael Huijser, was appointed as the new director of the museum.

References

External links

Buildings and structures completed in 1656
Maritime museums in the Netherlands
Museums established in 1973
Museums in Amsterdam
National museums of the Netherlands